Thank You, Love (styled Thank you, Love) is the third album by Japanese singer and songwriter Kana Nishino. It was released on June 22, 2011.  It debuted and peaked at number one on the Oricon Albums Chart. It sold 178,006 copies the first week and remained classified 67 weeks for a total of 376,102 copies sold. It contains four of her singles and eight new tracks. It comes out in CD and CD + DVD format, and on the DVD there are four clips from her singles.

Background
It was released just one year after the second album To Love. It contains 14 songs, including 5 singles released since her previous album. Like To Love, the album starts with a "Prologue" and ends with an "Epilogue". The album was produced around April 2011 when Nishino graduated from university and took a break. When Nishino looked back at her life, she felt gratitude for the people around her and the "connection" with the fans who could meet her face in music works, blogs, and live performances. "It was because of these people that I strongly felt that I existed, so the title was "Thank you, Love" with gratitude."

Track listing

Charts

References

Kana Nishino albums
SME Records albums
2011 albums